Liutuan is a town in Changyi, Shandong, China. The town is mentioned as an example of the usage of the character 疃 (tuǎn) in the seventh edition of the Contemporary Chinese Dictionary and in the sixth edition of the Cihai Dictionary. , it has 72 villages under its administration.

References

Changyi, Shandong
Township-level divisions of Shandong